The Candidate (Spanish:El candidato) is a 1959 Argentine drama film directed by Fernando Ayala and starring Olga Zubarry, Duilio Marzio and Alfredo Alcón.

The film's sets were designed by the art director Mario Vanarelli.

Cast
 Alfredo Alcón 
 Hugo Astar 
 Guillermo Battaglia 
 Julián Bourges 
 Héctor Calcaño 
 Alberto Candeau
 Domingo Mania 
 Iris Marga 
 Duilio Marzio 
 Orestes Soriani 
 Olga Zubarry

References

Bibliography 
 Michael Pigott & Santiago Oyarzabel. World Film Locations: Buenos Aires. Intellect Ltd, 2014.

External links 
 

1959 films
Argentine drama films
1959 drama films
1950s Spanish-language films
Films directed by Fernando Ayala
Films set in Buenos Aires
1950s Argentine films